The Republic of Macedonia (officially under the provisional appellation "former Yugoslav Republic of Macedonia", short "FYR Macedonia") competed in the Winter Olympic Games for the first time at the 1998 Winter Olympics in Nagano, Japan.

Alpine skiing

Men

Women

Cross-country skiing

Men

C = Classical style, F = Freestyle

References
Official Olympic Reports
 Olympic Winter Games 1998, full results by sports-reference.com

Nations at the 1998 Winter Olympics
1998
Winter Olympics